Chung Chang-ho is a South Korean judge who has been serving judge at the International Criminal Court (ICC), serving since 2015. He is the second South Korean to serve in the chambers of the Court, following former president Song Sang-hyun.

Education and career

Chung was born in 1967 in South Korea and holds a B.A. in Law and an LL.M. in International Law from Seoul National University. He was a court martial judge in the Republic of Korea Air Force for three years from 1993 to 1996. Chung also served eight years as a district court judge and six years as a high court judge before his mandate at the ECCC. He was a research scholar at the London School of Economics and Political Science in 2001 and at the University of Hong Kong in 2005. Chung also served as a legal advisor and the South Korean delegate to the United Nations Commission on International Trade Law (UNCITRAL) at the South Korean embassy in Vienna, Austria, between 2008 and 2009.

Chung then served as a United Nations International Judge in the Extraordinary Chambers in the Courts of Cambodia (ECCC) in Phnom Penh, Cambodia, from 2011 to 2015. There, he was a member of the Rules and Procedure Committee and the Judicial Administration Committee.

Chung was elected to the International Criminal Court from the Asian Group of States, list A, for a term of nine years beginning 11 March 2015 and ending on the same day in 2024. He was assigned to the Pre-Trial Division. In 2021, he was the presiding judge in the proceedings that resulted in Congolese militia leader Bosco Ntaganda being sentenced to pay child soldiers and other victims a total of $30 million compensation, the Court's highest ever reparation order.

Publications
Chung has published extensively, the most recent of which was for the Harvard International Law Journal, echoing his long-standing opinion that the Asia-Pacific should move to create a regional court of human rights.

Situations and cases
Source:

Current
The Prosecutor v. Joseph Kony and Vincent Otti
The Prosecutor v. Ahmad Muhammad Harun ("Ahmad Harun") and Ali Muhammad Ali Abd-Al-Rahman ("Ali Kushayb")
The Prosecutor v. Omar Hassan Ahmad Al Bashir
The Prosecutor v. Abdel Raheem Muhammad Hussein
The Prosecutor v. Walter Osapiri Barasa
The Prosecutor v. Paul Gicheru and Philip Kipkoech Bett
The Prosecutor v. Bosco Ntaganda

Past
The Prosecutor v. Dominic Ongwen
The Prosecutor v. Sylvestre Mudacumura

References

1967 births
Living people
International Criminal Court judges
South Korean expatriates in Cambodia
South Korean judges of international courts and tribunals